Greg Woodhouse (born 2 January 1960) is a former soccer player. Greg grew up playing with St Paul's Bankstown and Chester Hill Presbyterian soccer clubs in the New South Wales Churches Football Association and went on to represent Australia. He made 24 appearances for the Australia national soccer team as a goalkeeper.  He is currently a coach at the International Goalkeepers Academy located at Blacktown Olympic Park (run by Jim Fraser, another former Socceroo goalkeeper).

Woodhouse has recently penned a lucrative new deal signing with Minto M League as its head coach for the upcoming season.

References 

1960 births
Living people
Australian soccer players
Bonnyrigg White Eagles FC players
Australia international soccer players
Sydney United 58 FC players
Bonnyrigg White Eagles FC managers
APIA Leichhardt FC players
Association football goalkeepers
Australian soccer coaches
1980 Oceania Cup players